Route 57 is a major road located in Winnipeg, Manitoba. It connects the suburbs of St. James and St. Boniface with the West End and the downtown core.

Route description
Route 57 begins as Dublin Avenue at Route 90 in the St. James Industrial Area near the Winnipeg airport.  It follows Dublin Avenue, then diverts onto eastbound Notre Dame Avenue. Between Sherbrook Street and Portage Avenue, Route 57 follows different streets, Notre Dame Avenue (westbound), Fort Street (northbound), or Cumberland Avenue (eastbound) and Carlton Street (southbound). The westbound route passes through the Exchange District.

East of Portage Avenue, Route 57 passes by Shaw Park and The Forks as it follows Pioneer Avenue (westbound) or William Stephenson Way (eastbound) via Main Street.  It crosses the Provencher Bridge into St. Boniface and follows Provencher Boulevard, the main street of Old St. Boniface.  It crosses the Seine River before ending at Archibald Street.

History
Dublin Avenue is named after the Irish capital. Notre Dame Avenue (not to be confused with Notre Dame Street in St. Boniface) was named for a girls' school which was located on the road (it later moved to Academy Road). William Stephenson Way (formerly Water Avenue) is named after the British-Canadian spy, who was born in Winnipeg.

Provencher Boulevard is named for Norbert Provencher, the first Roman Catholic Bishop of St. Boniface.  Many city heritage buildings, including the former St. Boniface City Hall, are located along this street.

Major intersections
From west to east:

References

057
Saint Boniface, Winnipeg
Downtown Winnipeg
St. James, Winnipeg
West End, Winnipeg